Gaviola may refer to:

 Cassandra Gaviola (born 1959), American actress known as Cassandra Gava later in her career
 Enrique Gaviola (1900–1989), Argentinian astrophysicist
 Karen Gaviola, American television producer and director

See also 
 2504 Gaviola, main-belt asteroid named after Enrique Gaviola